Honeycutt is a surname. Notable people with the surname:
 Andrew Honeycutt, an African-American educator and political candidate for Georgia's 63rd State House of Representatives District
 Deborah Honeycutt (born 1947), an American politician and medical doctor
 Francis Honeycutt (1883–1940), an American Olympic fencer
 Jay F. Honeycutt, the director of NASA ’s John F. Kennedy Space Center
 Jerald Honeycutt (born 1974), an American professional basketball player
 Rob Honeycutt, an American entrepreneur
 Rick Honeycutt (born 1954), a baseball pitching coach for the Los Angeles Dodgers and a former major league baseball pitcher
 Tyler Honeycutt (1990–2018), an American professional basketball player

Fictional characters
 Emmett Honeycutt, a character from the Showtime series Queer as Folk
 Matthew Honeycutt, a character from the novel series The Vampire Diaries

See also 
 5536 Honeycutt, an asteroid
 Hunnicutt